Chu Hsi-ning (born Chu Ch'ing-hai; 16 June 1927 – 27 March 1998) was a Chinese writer based in Taiwan.

His daughters Chu T’ien-wen and Chu T’ien-hsin are also famous writers.

Chu was born in Suqian, China. In 1945, he entered an art college in Hangzhou, but dropped out to join the nationalist army in the struggle against the communists. He reached the rank of colonel. He was one of the soldiers who accompanied Chiang Kai-shek to Taiwan in 1949. He came to prominence as a writer in the 1950s and remained productive until his death.

He can be grouped with anti-communist writers or the soldier writers; his fiction displays an interest in the impact of modernity on ordinary people and in the clash of social forces. These are concerns he inherited from the May Fourth Movement and the writers of the 1930s. However, Chu Hsi-ning, unlike many Chinese writers of the 1930s, was a conservative. His stories reinforce traditional communal values and a morally Christian worldview.

Chu is the father of writers Chu T’ien-wen and Chu T’ien-hsin, together with whom he participated in the Three-Three series of publications in the late 1970s. The "threes" stand for the Three Principles of the People and for the Christian trinity.

Works translated to English

"Dawn" was adapted into a 1968 film directed by Sung Tsun-shou and produced by Li Han-hsiang, starring Peter Yang.

References

1927 births
1998 deaths
Writers from Suqian
Chinese Christians
Republic of China novelists
Taiwanese male novelists
20th-century novelists
Chinese male novelists
Taiwanese people from Jiangsu
Taiwanese male short story writers
Chinese male short story writers
20th-century Taiwanese short story writers
20th-century Chinese male writers
Republic of China short story writers
Short story writers from Jiangsu